Syndiamesa is a genus of non-biting midges in the subfamily Diamesinae of the bloodworm family Chironomidae.

Species
The genus includes the following species:

 S. edwardsi (Pagast, 1947)
 S. hygropetrica (Kieffer, 1909)
 S. mira (Makarchenko, 1980)
 S. nigra Rossaro, 1980
 S. serratosioi Kownacki, 1981
 S. yosiii Tokunaga, 1964

References

Chironomidae